Ascoparia is a genus of worms belonging to the family Ascopariidae.

The genus has cosmopolitan distribution.

Species:

Ascoparia neglecta 
Ascoparia secunda

References

Acoelomorphs